Saint-Priest-de-Gimel (literally Saint-Priest of Gimel) is a commune in the Corrèze department in central France. Corrèze station, situated in the commune, has rail connections to Brive-la-Gaillarde, Ussel and Bordeaux.

Population

See also
Communes of the Corrèze department

References

Communes of Corrèze
Corrèze communes articles needing translation from French Wikipedia